Macomona is a genus of marine bivalve molluscs, in the family Tellinidae.

Species 
Macomona australis (Deshayes, 1855)
Macomona deltoidalis (Lamarck, 1818)
Macomona imbellis (Hanley, 1844)
Macomona liliana (Iredale, 1915)

References 
 OBIS
 Powell A. W. B., New Zealand Mollusca, William Collins Publishers Ltd, Auckland, New Zealand 1979 
 Glen Pownall, New Zealand Shells and Shellfish, Seven Seas Publishing Pty Ltd, Wellington, New Zealand 1979 

Tellinidae
Bivalve genera